Oshodi-Isolo (Yoruba: Oṣòdì-Ìsọlọ̀) is a Local Government Area (LGA) within Lagos State. It was formed by the second republic Governor of Lagos State, Alhaji Lateef Kayode Jakande, also known as 'Baba Kekere' and the first Executive Chairman of the Local Government was late Sir Isaac Ademolu Banjoko. The LGA is part of the Ikeja Division of Lagos State, Nigeria. At the 2006 Census it had a population of 621,509 people, and an area of 45 square kilometers. On the 1st of August 2021, Honourable Kehinde Oloyede Al-Maroof was elected for a first term into office as the Executive Chairman.

Wards
The Local Government was constituted by eleven wards as below listed:
Oshodi/Bolade
Orile Oshodi
Mafoluku
Shogunle
Shogunle/Alasia
Isolo
Ajao Estate
Ilasamaja
Okota
Ishagatedo
Oke-Afa/Ejigbo

Politics
The first Executive Chairman of Isolo LCDA is Mrs. Mary Modupeola Fafowora-Oseghale who served for two terms in office and also as an Executive Secretary between 2004 and 2011.

It is represented in the Lagos state House of Assembly by Shokunle Hakeem (APC) for Oshodi/Isolo I and Emeka Odimogu Oshodi (APC) for Isolo II.

In the House of Representatives, Dawodu Bashiru  and Ganiyu Abiodun Johnson both of the APC represent the Oshodi-Isolo I and Oshodi-Isolo II respectively.

Gallery

References

External links
 Oshodi-Isolo Local Government

Local Government Areas in Lagos State
Local Government Areas in Yorubaland